, better known by his pen name , was a Japanese author and critic who lived during the Meiji Era. His Dharma name was Shungyōin Ryokuu Suikaku Koji (春暁院緑雨醒客居士), which was chosen by Kōda Rohan.

Biography
After Ichiyō died on November of that year, Ryokuu helped her mother and sister make a living although he was far from being well-off.

Ryokuu was a distinguished aphorist, as well as one of the most outspoken critics. Collections of his aphorisms were published in the late 20th century.

In 1904, the tuberculosis which had plagued Ryokuu for years worsened, and no medical care helped him recuperate. On his deathbed, he referred Ichiyō's diaries, which he had hoped to publish, to Baba Kochō, and dictated him his own obituary. He died in the morning of 13 April of the same year.

See also
Japanese literature
List of Japanese writers
Writers from Japan

External links 
 作家別作品リスト：斎藤 緑雨 Aozora Bunko page for Saitō Ryokuu

1868 births
1904 deaths
Japanese writers
Japanese Buddhists
20th-century Buddhists